New York State Route 398 (NY 398) was an east–west state highway located within the town of Stuyvesant in Columbia County, New York, in the United States. It served as a short connector between NY 9J in the hamlet of Stuyvesant and U.S. Route 9 (US 9) in the hamlet of Sunnyside southwest of the village of Kinderhook. NY 398 was assigned in the early 1930s and remained unchanged until 1980, when ownership and maintenance of the highway was transferred to Columbia County. The route was redesignated as County Route 26A at that time.

Route description
NY 398 began at an intersection with NY 9J in downtown Stuyvesant. The route progressed eastward, passing a small park and intersecting with local roads. NY 398 passed Firwood Barn as it climbed in elevation. The route turned to the southeast and passed some small parks. After that, the route became more rural, climbing even higher in elevation and intersecting with another local road.

After the local road however, the highway began to patch its way through several hills and mountains, but this did not last long. The highway then became rural again, emerging from the mountains behind it. There were a few short hills the rest of the way along NY 398, until it entered the small hamlet of Sunnyside. There, it became a little more suburbanized, and the highway terminated at an intersection with US 9.

History
NY 398 was assigned  to the highway connecting the hamlets of Stuyvesant and Sunnyside. It remained unchanged until January 28, 1980, when the NY 398 designation was officially removed from the highway. Ownership and maintenance of NY 398's former routing was transferred from the state of New York to Columbia County on April 1, 1980, as part of a highway maintenance swap between the two levels of government. The highway became part of County Route 26A (CR 26A), a designation that continues west of NY 9J to a junction with River View Street near the Hudson River.

Major intersections

See also

List of county routes in Columbia County, New York
New York State Route 217, the other route affected by the 1980 Columbia County maintenance swap

References

External links

398
Transportation in Columbia County, New York